Henry Philip Tappan (April 18, 1805 – November 15, 1881) was an American philosopher, educator and academic administrator. He is officially considered the first president of the University of Michigan.

A pioneer in the transformation of American university curricula, he was instrumental in fashioning the University of Michigan as a prototype for American research universities, and has been called the "John the Baptist of the age of the American university." His academic career was ultimately cut short by personality clashes with the university's Board of Regents, and he finished his life in self-imposed exile in Europe. He has been described as disruptive to progress the education for agriculture, despite state efforts to ail the issue. He is considered by many historical scholars to be someone of elitist interests, rather than the betterment of the statue economy.

Biography

Early life 
Henry Philip Tappan was born on April 18, 1805, in the village of Rhinebeck, New York. His father was of Prussian descent and his mother of Dutch descent. He attended Union College and studied under its president, Eliphalet Nott, graduating with Phi Beta Kappa honors in 1825. He graduated from Auburn Theological Seminary two years later and planned a career in ministry. 

He became associate pastor at the Dutch Reformed church in Schenectady, New York for one year, and was then pastor at the Congregational church in Pittsfield, Massachusetts.

He married Julia Livingston on April 7, 1828.

A throat affliction prompted him to leave for a trip to the West Indies, and upon his return he joined the faculty of the University of the City of New York (now New York University ) as a professor of philosophy.

Philosophical writings  
Tappan embarked on writing a series of philosophical treatises that began to influence thinking in Europe. He received a Doctor of Divinity degree from Union College in 1845. He toured Europe between 1849 and 1851 and became increasingly convinced of the superiority of the "German model" (or Prussian model, as it was known at the time) of public education, in which a complete system of primary schools, secondary schools, and a university are all administered by the state and supported with tax dollars.

The German model had first gained widespread attention through the 1835 publication of Sarah Austin's English translation of Victor Cousin's Report on the State of Public Instruction in Prussia, originally prepared for the French Minister of Public Instruction and Ecclesiastical Affairs in 1831. This model stood in direct contrast to the prevailing state of higher education in the U.S., where virtually all institutions of higher learning were privately run with no official connection to any public school system, which were themselves rare.

Principally due to the Cousin report's influence on two men, John Davis Pierce and Isaac Edwin Crary, the basic tenets of the German education model had made their way into the Michigan Constitution of 1836, which officially chartered the University of Michigan and was the first state constitution in the U.S. to truly embrace the German model. The specific implementation outlined therein, however, proved unwieldy in practice, and for some time the Board of Regents made little progress in implementing the vision for the university, even postponing indefinitely the appointment of a chancellor in favor of a rotating roster of professors who performed the day-to-day administrative duties.

President of the University of Michigan  

In 1850, the state of Michigan adopted a new state constitution that created the office of President of the University of Michigan and directed the newly elected Board of Regents to select someone for the office. They sent a representative to the East to solicit recommendations, and former Secretary of the Navy George Bancroft recommended Henry Tappan. Despite this recommendation, the regents first elected Henry Barnard of Connecticut, who declined the offer. Although John Hiram Lathrop (then Chancellor of the University of Wisconsin–Madison) was also considered for the job following Barnard's refusal, Tappan was unanimously elected on August 12, 1852. His starting salary was $1,500 per year.

Tappan was proud of the fact that while he was president of the University of Michigan, faculty were hired based not on their religious connections, but on their capacities within their field of study.

Tappan was also a strong proponent of the German model of university curriculum, which emphasized research, laboratory study, elective courses, and the increased importance of science and engineering, rather than the "British model" of recitation in a core classical arts curriculum that typified most major American universities of the time. His proposed elective course included "besides other branches, Civil Engineering, Astronomy with the use of an Observatory, and the application of Chemistry and other sciences to agriculture and the industrial arts generally." Shortly after his arrival, Michigan became the second university in the country (after Harvard) to issue Bachelor of Science degrees. Tappan also had plans for a graduate program, once the undergraduate curriculum was more fully developed.

Tappan received a Doctor of Laws degree from Columbia College in 1854.

Removal as president 
Despite the success of the flourishing university, Tappan's aristocratic bearing and perceived tendency to magnify his own importance did not sit well with the new regents who had been elected in 1858, many of whom came from rural areas and were without advanced education—only two of the ten members were college graduates themselves. One regent, Donald McIntyre, a strict prohibitionist, disapproved of Tappan's serving wine at dinner. Another, Ebenezer Lakin Brown, had a particular dislike for Tappan's lofty airs, and at the board's June 25, 1863, meeting, he introduced a resolution removing Tappan as president. It passed unanimously, after which the regents also fired Tappan's son John as university librarian and appointed Erastus Otis Haven as the new president.

Upon his removal, Tappan remarked, "This matter belongs to history; the pen of history is held by Almighty Justice, and I fear not the record it will make of my conduct, whether public or private, in relation to the affairs of the University." He immediately left Michigan and moved his family to Europe, residing in Berlin, Paris, Bonn, Frankfurt, Basel, and Geneva.

Tappan's firing was unpopular with students and the broader community, as it came with no warning, at a time when the university was more successful than ever, for no wrongdoing other than personal friction with the regents, and from a board whose terms in office were all expiring (save one) in just a few months and who were due to be replaced with new regents (already elected) who had expressed a desire to form a better working relationship with Tappan. Henry Barnard, by then the editor of The American Journal of Education, called the dismissal an "act of savage, unmitigated barbarism" in light of Tappan's work being "without a precedent in the educational history of the country." At the suggestion of his supporters, Tappan himself wrote a lengthy response to his dismissal, generally praising the first Board of Regents and excoriating the second as incompetent, and also singling out certain faculty members for criticism.

When the new Board of Regents took office in 1864, the flood of support for Tappan led them to consider re-hiring him, but in the end they felt it would be disruptive to the university, in light of Tappan's subsequent response.

Later years 

In 1874 and 1875 the Board of Regents passed resolutions commending Tappan's service to the university and inviting him to return to Ann Arbor to be honored; the latter expressly withdrew "any censure express or implied in the resolutions which severed his connection" to the university. Tappan, who had moved to Europe after his firing, expressed a desire to return, but twice deferred accepting the invitation, citing first his age and then the health of his daughter.

He never returned to Michigan and died in his villa in Vevey, Switzerland on November 15, 1881, where he is buried overlooking Lake Geneva.

Commemoration 
 The Tappan Professorship of Law was created in 1879, with former Michigan governor Alpheus Felch the first to hold it.
 Tappan Hall, the oldest extant classroom building on the University of Michigan campus, was finished in 1894. It houses the History of Art Department and the Fine Art Library.  It also houses a bas relief of Tappan by Karl Bitter.
 Tappan Elementary School was built on East University Avenue, Ann Arbor, in 1885. It was sold to the University of Michigan in the 1920s and renamed East Hall.
 Tappan Junior High School was first opened in 1925 in the Burns Park area of Ann Arbor. The building was renamed Burns Park Elementary School after a new and larger junior high school facility opened nearby in 1951.
 Tappan Junior High School (now Tappan Middle School, East Stadium Blvd, Ann Arbor, Michigan) opened its doors to new students in 1951.

Works 
 
 
 
 
 
  (Inaugural speech)

Notes

References

Further reading

External links
 
 
 "A Creation of My Own" - University of Michigan Heritage Project

|-

1805 births
1881 deaths
19th-century American educators
19th-century American philosophers
 American expatriate academics
American expatriates in France
American expatriates in Germany
American expatriates in Switzerland
American people of Dutch descent
American people of Prussian descent  
Auburn Theological Seminary alumni
Burials in the canton of Vaud
Columbia College (New York)  alumni
New York University faculty
People from Ann Arbor, Michigan
People from Rhinebeck, New York
People from Vevey
Philosophers from Michigan
Philosophers from New York (state)
Union College (New York) alumni